Moovendhar is a 1998 Tamil language comedy film directed by Suraj (credited as C. G. Suraaj). The film stars Sarath Kumar and Devayani. It was released on 12 January 1998.

Plot

Manimaran (Sarath Kumar), his father Poochi (S. V. Ramadas), and his grandfather Nagappan (M. N. Nambiar) are short-tempered persons who beat the villagers for a simple quarrel. Only Manimaran's mother, Sivagami (Lakshmi), can control them. Uma (Rajeswari), Manimaran's sister, marries a man from another village. Manimaran falls in love with Vaidehi (Devayani), a Brahmin girl. Manimaran takes his father and grandfather to Vaidehi's house to ask her to marry him. Vaidehi's father (Delhi Ganesh) refuses that marriage proposal because of caste differences. Manimaran wants Vaidehi to be his wife somehow, for which his father and grandfather tell him an idea. Vaidehi goes to the temple for a prayer and Manimaran comes there. When the prayer is over and she opens her eyes, Manimaran stands in front of her and takes a thaali and ties it around Vaidehi's neck. Thus, Manimaran marries Vaidehi unexpectedly and she suddenly faints in shock. Vaidehi's father went to the police station to complain but to no avail. Manimaran's mother Sivagami welcomes Vaidehi, who has come home to live as a daughter-in-law, and changes her mind. That same night Manimaran and Vaidehi start their married life together on the first night. Vaidehi was not easily acquainted with her husband's house. In a fight against Manimaran, the antagonist becomes blind in one eye and decides to take revenge on Manimaran. When Manimaran drives his pregnant sister, the antagonist stops him but Manimaran beats the antagonist and his henchmen. Uma arrives too late at the hospital and dies with her baby. Vaidehi leaves their house because of her husband's behaviour who brings Uma's death. Manimaran changes his behaviour and tries to convince Vaidehi to come back home.

Cast

Sarath Kumar as Manimaran
Devayani as Vaidehi
Rajeswari as Uma
Lakshmi as Sivagami
Manivannan as Velu Nayakan
Anandaraj as Velliangiri
M. N. Nambiar as Nagappan
S. V. Ramadoss as Poochi
Delhi Ganesh as Vaidehi's father
Anu Mohan as Dharmidasan
Vichu Vishwanath as Vichu
MLA Thangaraj as Vichu's father
Suryakanth
Anwar Ali Khan
Halwa Vasu as Vettu (Housemaid)
Chelladurai
Pasi Narayanan as Iyer
Vellai Subbaiah as Iyer
T. K. S. Natarajan as Iyer
Bonda Mani as Iyer
Sabitha Anand as Vaidehi's sister
Kovai Senthil as Astrologer
Premi
Radha Bhai as Vaidehi's grandmother
Monica as Vaidehi's sister
Joker Thulasi as Gurukkal
Omakuchi Narasimhan
Thiruppur Ramasamy as Irulappan 'Iyerkai Vaithiyer'
G. K. as Velliangiri's uncle
Theni Kunjarammal
Pasi Sathya as Nurse
Vijay Ganesh as Bus passenger
Kavithasri (special appearance)
Kalyan (special appearance)
Manorama (guest appearance)

Soundtrack

The film score and the soundtrack were composed by Sirpy. The soundtrack, released in 1998, features 7 tracks with lyrics written by Arivumathi, Palani Bharathi and Thavasimani.

Reception
Sureshbabu of indolink.com gave 3.5 out to 5 and described the film as family entertainment

References

External links
 

1998 films
Indian action drama films
1990s Tamil-language films
Films scored by Sirpy
1990s action drama films